The 1976 Macdonald Brier, the Canadian men's national curling championship was held from March 7 to 13, 1976 at Regina Exhibition Stadium in Regina, Saskatchewan. The total attendance for the week was 61,110. This was the final Brier in which regulation games were 12 ends in length.

Team Newfoundland, who was skipped by Jack MacDuff captured the Brier tankard as they finished round robin play with a 9–2 record. This was Newfoundland's first ever Brier title. MacDuff's rink were considered heavy underdogs in the event as their odds of winning the Brier had been put at 1,000 to 1, making the victory extraordinary.

The MacDuff rink would go onto represent Canada in the 1976 Air Canada Silver Broom, the men's world curling championships in Duluth, Minnesota. They could not replicate the Brier success however, as they finished ninth out of ten teams with a 2–7 record, which at the time was the worst finish by a Canadian team in the world championships.

British Columbia's 6–5 victory over Alberta in Draw 11 was the fifth double extra end game in Brier history and the first since . This game was one of eleven games in the tournament which went to an extra end, setting a record for most extra end games in one Brier. This would end up being a Macdonald era (until ) record and wouldn't be broken until .

This Brier also set a record for most blank ends in a single Brier as 199 ends were blanked. To date, this is the most blank ends in a single Brier. This record would not be broken until .

Teams
The teams were as follows:

Round Robin standings
Final Round Robin standings

Round Robin results
All draw times are listed in Central Standard Time (UTC-06:00).

Draw 1
Sunday, March 7, 1:30 pm

Draw 2
Sunday, March 7, 7:30 pm

Draw 3
Monday, March 8, 9:00 am

Draw 4
Monday, March 8, 1:30 pm

Draw 5
Monday, March 8, 7:30 pm

Draw 6
Tuesday, March 9, 9:00 am

Draw 7
Tuesday, March 9, 2:00 pm

Draw 8
Wednesday, March 10, 1:30 pm

Draw 9
Wednesday, March 10, 7:30 pm

Draw 10
Thursday, March 11, 1:30 pm

Draw 11
Thursday, March 11, 7:30 pm

Draw 12
Friday, March 12, 1:30 pm

Draw 13
Friday, March 12, 7:30 pm

Draw 14
Saturday, March 13, 12:00 pm

Awards

All-Star Team 
The media selected the following curlers as All-Stars.

Ross G.L. Harstone Award
The Ross Harstone Award was presented to the player chosen by their fellow peers as the curler who best represented Harstone's high ideals of good sportsmanship, observance of the rules, exemplary conduct and curling ability.

References

Sports competitions in Regina, Saskatchewan
Macdonald Brier, 1976
The Brier
Curling in Saskatchewan
1976 in Saskatchewan
March 1976 sports events in Canada